Jasmin Nunige, née Baumann (born 28 December 1973) is a Swiss former cross-country skier. She competed in two events at the 1994 Winter Olympics.

Cross-country skiing results
All results are sourced from the International Ski Federation (FIS).

Olympic Games

World Championships

World Cup

Season standings

References

External links
 

1973 births
Living people
Swiss female cross-country skiers
Olympic cross-country skiers of Switzerland
Cross-country skiers at the 1994 Winter Olympics
Place of birth missing (living people)
People from Davos
Sportspeople from Graubünden
20th-century Swiss women